Pontypool railway station may refer to:

 Pontypool and New Inn railway station, to the south east of Pontypool town centre
 Pontypool Clarence Street railway station (closed), on the Newport, Abergavenny and Hereford Railway Taff Vale Extension
 Pontypool Crane Street railway station (closed), on the Monmouthshire Railway and Canal Company line